A peace conference is a diplomatic meeting where representatives of certain states, armies, or other warring parties converge to end hostilities and sign a peace treaty.

Significant international peace conferences in the past include the following:
 St. Petersburg Declaration of 1868
 Algeciras Conference (1905)
 Hague Conventions of 1899 and 1907
 Versailles (1919)
 Good Friday Agreement (1998)

See also
 Peace congress
 Peace treaties by country (list)
 List of peace activists